Shamrock Rovers Football Club is an Irish association football club based in Tallaght, South Dublin. It is the women's section of the League of Ireland club Shamrock Rovers FC. During the late 1990s and early 2000s, Shamrock Rovers were one of the most successful teams in women's association football in the Republic of Ireland, winning both the Dublin Women's Soccer League and the FAI Women's Cup five times in a row. In 2002–03 Shamrock Rovers became the first women's team to represent the Republic of Ireland in Europe, and in 2011–12 they were founder members of the Women's National League. In November 2022, it was confirmed that Shamrock Rovers would be re-entering the Women's National League for the 2023 season after a nine-year hiatus.

History

1990s
In the early 1990s Denis Power helped establish Castle Rovers FC, a women's football club founded by employees of the Irish civil service. Castle Rovers played in the Dublin Women's Soccer League and were league champions in 1995 and 1996. In 1996 they also won the FAI Women's Cup. In 1996 this club was taken over by Shamrock Rovers. With a team that included Olivia O'Toole, Rovers went on to become one of the leading Republic of Ireland women's football teams during the late 1990s and early 2000s, winning four successive Dublin Women's Soccer League and FAI Women's Cup "doubles" between 1998 and 2001.

2002–03 UEFA Women's Cup
After winning the 2001 FAI Women's Cup, Shamrock Rovers qualified for the 2002–03 UEFA Women's Cup. They played in Group 3, finishing third.

Women's National League 
In 2011–12, together with Peamount United, Castlebar Celtic, Cork Women's FC, Raheny United and Wexford Youths, Rovers were founder members of the Women's National League (WNL). Rovers played just three seasons in the WNL. In both 2011–12 and 2012–13 they finished bottom of the league and at the end of the 2013–14 season they withdrew.

Revival
In November 2022 it was confirmed that Rovers' senior women's team would come back ahead of the 2023 season, with former UCD manager Collie O'Neill managing them. That month Áine O'Gorman became their first signing, from Peamount United. They then signed two more from Peamount: first young goalkeeper Summer Lawless, then Alannah McEvoy. On 4 December they signed their first non-Peamount signing, Jessica Hennessey from Athlone Town. On 7 December, four of Rovers' U19 players (Maria Reynolds, Abby Tuthill, Jaime Thompson and Orlaith O'Mahony) were promoted to the WNL team. On 8 December, Rovers announced the signing of the 2014 Puskás Award runner-up and Republic of Ireland international Stephanie Roche.

Players

Current squad

Former players

Notable former coaches
  Synan Braddish
  Grainne Kierans
  Ian Nesbitt

Honours

Castle Rovers
 
Dublin Women's Soccer League
Winners: 1995, 1996: 2
FAI Women's Cup
Winners: 1996: 1

Shamrock Rovers
 
Dublin Women's Soccer League
Winners: 1998, 1999, 2000, 2001, 2002: 5
Runners-up: 1997, 2003, 2004: 3
FAI Women's Cup
Winners: 1997, 1998, 1999, 2000, 2001: 5
Runners-up: 2002: 1
DWSL Premier Cup
Winners: 1998, 1999, 2000, 2001, 2002: 5 
WNL Cup
Runners-up: 2012: 1

References

Women
Women's association football clubs in the Republic of Ireland
Association football clubs established in 1996
1996 establishments in Ireland
Women's National League (Ireland) teams
Dublin Women's Soccer League teams
Association football clubs in South Dublin (county)